Robert Smith (born 1870; date of death unknown) was an English footballer who played in the Football League for Stoke.

Career
Smith was born in Stoke-upon-Trent and played for Newcastle Swifts before joining Stoke in 1891. He played one match in the Football League which came in a 3–1 defeat to Wolverhampton Wanderers during the 1891–92 season where he played in place of the injured Davy Brodie. He was released soon after and joined Burslem Port Vale where he failed to make a first team appearance.

Career statistics
Source:

References

1870 births
Year of death missing
Footballers from Stoke-on-Trent
English footballers
Association football defenders
Stoke City F.C. players
Port Vale F.C. players
English Football League players